

Congressional elections

Presidential elections
1988 Republican presidential primaries:
George H. W. Bush - 8,258,512 (67.91%)
Bob Dole - 2,333,375 (19.19%)
Pat Robertson - 1,097,446 (9.02%)
Jack Kemp - 331,333 (2.72%)
Unpledged - 56,990 (0.47%)
Pierre S. du Pont, IV - 49,783 (0.41%)
Alexander M. Haig - 26,619 (0.22%)
Harold Stassen - 2,682 (0.02%)

1996 United States presidential election
Bill Clinton/Al Gore (D) (inc.) - 47,401,898 (49.2%) and 379 electoral votes (31 states and D.C. carried)
Bob Dole/Jack Kemp (R) - 39,198,482 (40.7%) and 159 electoral votes (19 states carried)
Ross Perot/Pat Choate (Reform) -  7,680,908 (8.0%)
Ralph Nader/Winona LaDuke (Green) -  654,731 (0.7%)
Harry Browne/Jo Jorgensen (Libertarian) -  485,134 (0.5%)
Howard Phillips/Herbert Titus (Taxpayers) -  182,723 (0.2%)
John Hagelin/Michael Tompkins (Natural Law) -  111,528  (0.1%)
Others -  674,414 (0.7%)

References

Electoral history of politicians from New York (state)
New York (state) Republicans
Jack Kemp